Black Shaheen may refer to:

 (Black) Shaheen Falcon (Falco peregrinus peregrinator), South Asian subspecies of peregrine falcon
 Black Shaheen, variant of the Storm Shadow cruise missile